Joey Eloms (born April 4, 1976) is a former American football defensive back. He played for the Seattle Seahawks from 1998 to 1999 and for the New York/New Jersey Hitmen in 2001.

References

1976 births
Living people
American football cornerbacks
American football safeties
Indiana Hoosiers football players
Seattle Seahawks players
Scottish Claymores players
New York/New Jersey Hitmen players
Players of American football from Fort Wayne, Indiana